Allen George Lincoln (c. 1901 – September 15, 1987) was a college football and basketball player and coach. He coached the Sewanee Tigers basketball team. He played for the Missouri Tigers, and is a member of the Webster Groves High School All-Century team. He scored 46 points in a 76–0 victory over long-time rival Kirkwood on Thanksgiving Day, 1917.

References

1900s births
Year of birth uncertain
1987 deaths
American football fullbacks
Missouri Tigers football players
Missouri Tigers men's basketball players
Sewanee Tigers football coaches
Sewanee Tigers men's basketball coaches
People from Webster Groves, Missouri
Players of American football from St. Louis
Basketball players from St. Louis
American men's basketball players
Basketball coaches from Missouri